The North Saskatchewan Region is a land-use framework region in northern Alberta, Canada. One of seven in the province, each is intended to develop and implement a regional plan, complementing the planning efforts of member municipalities in order to coordinate future growth. Corresponding roughly to major watersheds while following municipal boundaries, these regions are managed by Alberta Environment and Parks.

Communities

The following municipalities are contained in the North Saskatchewan Region.

 

Cities
 Beaumont
 Camrose
 Edmonton
 Fort Saskatchewan
 Leduc
 Lloydminster
 St. Albert
 Spruce Grove
 Wetaskiwin

Urban service areas
 Sherwood Park

Towns
 Banff
 Bashaw
 Bon Accord
 Bruderheim
 Calmar
 Daysland
 Devon
 Drayton Valley
 Elk Point
 Gibbons
 Hardisty
 Killam
 Lamont
 Legal
 Millet
 Morinville
 Mundare
 Provost
 Redwater
 Rocky Mountain House
 Sedgewick
 Smoky Lake
 St. Paul
 Stony Plain
 Thorsby
 Tofield
 Two Hills
 Vegreville
 Vermilion
 Viking
 Wainwright

Villages
 Alliance
 Amisk
 Andrew
 Bawlf
 Bittern Lake
 Breton
 Caroline
 Chauvin
 Chipman
 Czar
 Dewberry
 Edberg
 Edgerton
 Ferintosh
 Forestburg
 Hay Lakes
 Heisler
 Holden
 Hughenden
 Innisfree
 Irma
 Kitscoty
 Lougheed
 Mannville
 Marwayne
 Myrnam
 Paradise Valley
 Rosalind
 Ryley
 Spring Lake
 Vilna
 Wabamun
 Warburg
 Waskatenau

Summer villages
 Argentia Beach
 Betula Beach
 Burnstick Lake
 Crystal Springs
 Golden Days
 Grandview
 Horseshoe Bay
 Itaska Beach
 Kapasiwin
 Lakeview
 Ma-Me-O Beach
 Norris Beach
 Point Alison
 Poplar Bay
 Seba Beach
 Silver Beach
 Sundance Beach

Métis settlements
 Buffalo Lake
 Kikino

Municipal districts
 Beaver County
 Brazeau County
 Camrose County
 Clearwater County
 Flagstaff County
 Lamont County
 Leduc County
 County of Minburn No. 27
 Parkland County
 Municipal District of Provost No. 52
 County of St. Paul No. 19
 Smoky Lake County
 Sturgeon County
 Thorhild County
 County of Two Hills No. 21
 County of Vermilion River
 Municipal District of Wainwright No. 61
 County of Wetaskiwin No. 10

Specialized municipalities
 Strathcona County

Improvement districts
 Improvement District No. 9 (Banff)
 Improvement District No. 13 (Elk Island)

Indian reserves
 Alexander 134
 Big Horn 144A
 Buck Lake 133C
 Ermineskin 138
 Louis Bull 138B
 Makaoo 120
 O'Chiese 203
 O'Chiese Cemetery 203A
 Pigeon Lake 138A
 Puskiakiwenin 122
 Saddle Lake 125
 Stony Plain 135
 Sunchild 202
 Unipouheos 121
 Wabamun 133A
 Wabamun 133B
 Whitefish Lake 128

References

Alberta land-use framework regions